The 2021 Wofford Terriers football team represented Wofford College as a member of the Southern Conference (SoCon) during the 2021 NCAA Division I FCS football season . The Terriers were led by fourth-year head coach Josh Conklin and played their home games at Gibbs Stadium in Spartanburg, South Carolina.

Schedule

References

Wofford
Wofford Terriers football seasons
Wofford Terriers football